Tycoon is a British reality television show, based on the existing Peter Jones/Simon Cowell production American Inventor, which began on 19 June 2007 at 9.00pm. It was fronted by Peter Jones, who searched for entrepreneurs with ideas that he helped turn into profit-making companies. The winner is chosen by the public. The entrepreneurs compete for support from Jones and the other companies' profits. The series also included a viewers' competition in which 25% of the winning company's shares were divided between 2,000 viewers.

After two weeks Tycoon was pulled from its slot at 9pm on Tuesday night due to disappointing ratings. After missing a week, the series returned on Monday 9 July at 10pm, cut from one hour to 30 minutes and reduced from six episodes to five.

The final of Tycoon took place on Monday 23 July on ITV, with Kate Thornton as host. Iain Morgan was announced the winner of the series.

Entrepreneurs and their products
Ages are as of 2007.

Iain Morgan (29), from Portsmouth WINNER: Importing and selling new radio controlled toy helicopters under the business name Bladez Toyz. Morgan was the first of the contestants to successfully bid for additional investment from Jones, having impressed him with his pre-orders for the toys which are manufactured in China.

Cathy Caudwell-Todd (46) and Helen James (44), from Yorkshire SECOND PLACE: A gardening products company initially called Girlie Gardeners and aimed at women. However, inspired by Jones, they changed their name to "Sod" and began to sell sweatshirts branded with the Sod logo. They were the early front-runners in the competition, turning a profit within the first two weeks.

Justin Chieffo (36), from Worcester THIRD PLACE: An environmentally friendly portable carrier bag dispenser. He was hampered by a lack of confidence in pitching his product.

Lauren Pope (23), from Torquay FOURTH PLACE: "Hair Rehab" 100% Human Hair Extension. Lauren's hair extensions would simply clip in and out. She made a strong start, developing a prototype which impressed Jones, but failed to secure funding for a trip to China to source suitable hair for use in the product.

Elizabeth Hackford (35), from London CLOSED DOWN WEEK 3: A natural alcoholic fruit drink for women called Take2. The drink would be made with natural fruit juices and vodka and have an alcoholic content of 4%. Coming into a highly competitive market, the product's branding was seen as particularly important, but Hackford found it difficult to come up with a name which met with Peter Jones' approval.

Tom Thurlow (17), from Cheltenham CLOSED DOWN WEEK 2: A free newspaper for teenagers called Snap News. Although Jones liked the idea and the title of Tom's paper, he lost confidence in Tom's focus and business ability after he hired an ex-editor of OK! magazine to design his paper. Jones felt it lost Tom's touch and shut down Tom's business in the second show.

Episodes

Critical reception
Critical response to the series was largely negative. Radio Times, despite running a three-page feature on the show and making it one of "Today's Choices" for 19 June, described it as "a wasted opportunity". Helen Rumbelow in The Times dismissed it as "a shameless rip-off of The Apprentice", while Paul Whitelaw in The Scotsman declared it "ITV's shameless rip-off of both The Apprentice and Dragons' Den".

Thomas Sutcliffe in The Independent was more positive, suggesting that "it might take", though also berating Peter Jones for trying too hard to emulate Sir Alan Sugar. Ally Ross in The Sun dubbed the show "The Crapprentice", noting that "where The Apprentice filled its hour with brilliant tasks and epic firing scenes, Tycoon has, well, nothing really".

Ratings
Episode 1: The show's overnight ratings for the first episode were an average of 2 million with a peak of 2.3 million, a 9% share and the lowest audience of the five major TV channels in its timeslot.

Episode 2: The second episode of Tycoon attracted just 1.9m (8.8%) at 9pm, only managing to outperform BBC Two by the smallest of margins (19,000 viewers).

Episode 3: Now shortened to half an hour at a new time of 10pm on a Monday night, the show pulled in 1.5 million viewers.

Episode 4: 1.4 million people (7%) tuned in to the fourth instalment of the programme, on Monday 16 July at 10pm.

Episode 5: The live final of Tycoon was watched by 1.3 million people (6.3% of the available audience watching TV between 10pm and 10.30pm) on Monday 23 July.

References

External links 

Sod Gardening - Cathy Caudwell-Todd and Helen James' company
Bladez Toyz - Iain Morgan's radio-controlled toy company
Be-Eco Bag - Justin Chieffo product
Hair Rehab London - Lauren Pope's company
 
Take2 - Elizabeth Hackford's company

2000s British reality television series
2007 British television series debuts
2007 British television series endings
Business-related television series in the United Kingdom
ITV (TV network) original programming